John Eyre may refer to:

Politicians
John Eyre (died 1581), Member of Parliament for Wiltshire and Salisbury
John Eyre (died 1639), MP for Cricklade
John Eyre (1659–1709), MP for Galway Borough, son of the above
John Eyre (died 1745), MP for Galway Borough, son of the above
John Eyre (1665–1715), MP for Downton
John Eyre, 1st Baron Eyre (c. 1720–1781), MP for Galway Borough, nephew of the above
John Eyre (Canadian politician) (1824–1882), Canadian attorney and politician

Sports
John Eyre (cricketer, born 1859), Marylebone Cricket Club cricketer
John Eyre (cricketer, born 1885) (1885–1964), Derbyshire cricketer
John Eyre (cricketer, born 1944), Derbyshire cricketer
John Eyre (footballer) (born 1974), English footballer

Religion
John Eyre (Archdeacon of Sheffield) (1845–1912), Anglican priest in the late 19th and early 20th centuries
John Eyre (evangelical minister) (1754–1803), English cleric
John Eyre (Archdeacon of Nottingham) (1758–1830)

Others
John Eyre (settler) (died 1685), English settler in Ireland
John Eyre (British artist) (1847–1927), English genre painter, designed and painted pottery
John Eyre (painter) (1771–1812), Australian painter and engraver
John William Henry Eyre (1869–1944), British bacteriologist
John R. Eyre, author and one-time owner of the Isleworth Mona Lisa

See also
Edward John Eyre (1815–1901), Australian explorer and Governor of Jamaica